Matthew Glen Davidson (born March 26, 1991) is an American professional baseball infielder for the Hiroshima Toyo Carp of Nippon Professional Baseball (NPB). He made his MLB debut with the Arizona Diamondbacks in 2013 and has also played in MLB for the Chicago White Sox, Cincinnati Reds and Oakland Athletics.

Career
Davidson attended Yucaipa High School in Yucaipa, California. He committed to attend the University of Southern California (USC) on a scholarship to play college baseball for the USC Trojans baseball team. After graduating from high school, the Arizona Diamondbacks selected Davidson in the first round of the 2009 Major League Baseball draft. Davidson signed with the Diamondbacks, forgoing his college commitment.

Arizona Diamondbacks
Davidson appeared in 72 games in 2009 for the Yakima Bears. In 2010, Davidson played for the South Bend Silver Hawks of the Class A Midwest League, and hit 16 home runs. He was promoted to the Visalia Rawhide of the Class A-Advanced California League later that season. Prior to the 2011 season, Davidson was ranked as the 99th best prospect by Baseball America. He played for Visalia in 2011. Prior to 2012, he was ranked 97th. That year, he played for the Mobile BayBears of the Class AA Southern League.

Davidson began the 2013 season with the Reno Aces of the Class AAA Pacific Coast League. He appeared in the All-Star Futures Game in 2013, and was named the game's most valuable player after he hit a go-ahead two-run home run. A day later, he won the 2013 Triple-A Home Run Derby, hitting 11 home runs across the three rounds, including seven in the first round, to surpass Brock Peterson's 10. The Diamondbacks promoted Davidson to the major leagues on August 11, 2013. He debuted that night with a 1-for-3  performance as an injury substitute for Cody Ross.

Chicago White Sox
On December 16, 2013, the Diamondbacks traded Davidson to the Chicago White Sox for pitcher Addison Reed. He played for the Charlotte Knights of the Class AAA International League in 2014 and 2015. He began the 2016 season with Charlotte and was promoted to the major leagues on June 30, 2016. In his first game with the White Sox, he fractured his foot.

On April 6, 2017, Davidson hit his first career-triple at his first at-bat since breaking his foot in 2016 against the Detroit Tigers. He hit his first home-run for the White Sox, a three-run blast in the fourth inning. He finished the game logging two hits, two runs, and three RBIs.

On June 13, 2017, Davidson hit his first-career Grand Slam against the Baltimore Orioles with the Chicago White Sox. For the season, he had the highest strikeout percentage among major leaguers against right-handed pitchers (39.9%).

On 2018 Opening Day against the Kansas City Royals on March 29, 2018, Davidson hit three home runs. Davidson became just the fourth player in Major League Baseball History to hit three home runs in a single game on opening day. The White Sox won 14-7.

Texas Rangers
On February 7, 2019, Davidson signed a minor league contract with the Texas Rangers. He was assigned to the Triple-A Nashville Sounds for the 2019 season, hitting .264/.325/.527/.852 with 33 home runs and 101 RBI. He became a free agent following the 2019 season.

Cincinnati Reds
On January 2, 2020, Davidson signed a minor league deal with the Cincinnati Reds. On July 24, 2020, Davidson had his contract selected to the 40-man roster, and same day, he was the starting designated hitter, making his Reds debut on Opening Day against the Detroit Tigers. But on July 25, 2020, he placed the 10-day injured list for his testing positive for COVID-19. The test ended up being a false positive.  On September 30, 2020, Davidson was selected back to the 40-man roster. On October 14, 2020, Davidson was outrighted off of the 40-man roster. Davidson elected free agency two days later on October 16.

Los Angeles Dodgers
On February 16, 2021, Davidson signed a minor league contract with the Los Angeles Dodgers organization that included an invitation to Spring Training. He spent the entire season with the Triple-A Oklahoma City Dodgers, where he hit .294 in 84 games with 28 home runs and 81 RBI.

Arizona Diamondbacks (second stint)
On November 22, 2021, Davidson signed a minor league deal with the Arizona Diamondbacks, and on April 21, 2022 his contract was purchased from the minor leagues by the Diamondbacks. Davidson appeared in 5 games for Arizona, going 1-for-10 with 3 walks. He was designated for assignment on May 2, when active rosters shrunk from 28 to 26.

Oakland Athletics
On May 9, 2022, Davidson signed a minor league deal with the Oakland Athletics and was assigned to the Triple-A Las Vegas Aviators. On June 7, Davidson was selected to the active roster. He was designated for assignment on June 21. He elected free agency on October 6, 2022.

Hiroshima Toyo Carp
On November 17, 2022, Davidson signed with the Hiroshima Toyo Carp of Nippon Professional Baseball.

Personal
Davidson and his wife, Julianne, have two children: a daughter who was born November 2014, and a son born July 2016. It was announced on July 25, 2020, that Davidson had tested (false) positive for COVID-19 one day after starting in the season opener.

References

External links

Perfect Game bio

1991 births
Living people
Arizona Diamondbacks players
Baseball players from California
Charlotte Knights players
Chicago White Sox players
Cincinnati Reds players
Major League Baseball third basemen
Mobile BayBears players
Nashville Sounds players
Oakland Athletics players
People from Yucaipa, California
Reno Aces players
Salt River Rafters players
South Bend Silver Hawks players
Sportspeople from San Bernardino County, California
Visalia Rawhide players
Yakima Bears players
Oklahoma City Dodgers players